The Commonwealth Cup is a trophy given to the winner of the annual American football game between the University of Virginia and Virginia Tech. 

Commonwealth Cup may also refer to:

Commonwealth Cup (horse race), a horse race run in Great Britain
Commonwealth Cup (professional wrestling), a professional wrestling tournament run by Virginia independent promotion NOVA Pro Wrestling
Commonwealth Classic, an annual basketball game between Boston College and the University of Massachusetts
Commonwealth of Independent States Cup, an association football tournament for clubs mainly from the Commonwealth of Independent States